Pablo Gad is a British Roots reggae singer and songwriter. He is considered one of the UK's most militant and outspoken vocalists in roots reggae music.

Biography

Pablo Gad was born in Jamaica and came to live in the United Kingdom in 1974. With a voice reminiscent of singer Fred Locks, Gad began recording in the late 1970s. His first singles were "International Dread" and "Kunta Kinte" on the Caribbean label in 1977. In 1978 Gad emerged with the classic "Bloodsuckers" on the Burning Sounds label.

Further singles included "Natty Loving", "Trafalgar Square", "Throw Your Dreams" and "Riddle I Dis". His first album "Trafalgar Square" was released in 1979 riding on the "Bloodsuckers" hit. The album was composed, produced and arranged by Pablo himself.

1980 was a prolific year for Pablo had a string of hits such as "Gun Fever", "Nursery Rhyme", "Oh Jah", "Fly Away Home" and "Hard Time". The "Hard Times" album  that featured some of these hits was released in 1980 on the FORM label. The single "Hard Time" was inspired by a visit back "home" to Jamaica where Pablo noticed that there was a different type of suffering experienced. He had noticed that life in the UK was not as bad as it seemed as people "got their Giro every week". Pablo Gad toured regularly with Black Slate as the main backing band. The band's Ras Elroy played bass on "Hard Time" with Keith and Tony Douglas on harmonies and Mark Lusardi as engineer.

The records helped him win two gold discs for best album and best male vocalist in the Black Echoes magazine readers poll in 1980.

Pablo Gad continued to recorded songs through the 1980s, 90's and 2000's and he is still recording currently. The "Best of Pablo Gad" compilation album on the Reggae On Top label in 1993 featured his early singles. He recorded with the Conscious Sounds label with The Bush Chemists.

Sampled

In 1990's some of Pablo Gad's tunes were sampled by Breakbeat hardcore artists. "Hard Time" has been sampled by The Prodigy, on their "Fire" single and also Nu Matic on their "Hard Times" single.

Discography

Albums

 1979: Trafalgar Square aka Blood Suckers  (Burning Sounds/Celluloid)
 1980: Hard Times (FORM)
 1983: Bloodsuckers (Sound Products Holland)
 1993: Epistles of Dub - Chapter One (Reggae On Top)
 1993: Life Without Death (Reggae On Top)
 2003: Don't Push Jah (Reggae On Top)
 2012: Armageddon Dawn “Raw” At King Earthquake Studio  (Reggae On Top)
 2012: Armageddon Dawn “Refined” At Conscious Sounds Studio (Reggae On Top)

References

Jamaican reggae singers